Liu Yuanyuan (born March 17, 1982, in Dalian) is a retired Chinese female biathlete and cross-country skier who represented China at the 2006 Winter Olympics in Torino.

During the 2006–07 FIS Cross-Country World Cup, Liu placed 4th at the 10 km freestyle race in Changchun. This landed her at 53rd place in the final World Cup ranking, making her the best Chinese cross-country skier of all time up to that point. Her record would stand for 15 years, until Wang Qiang became the first Chinese athlete to win a medal at the 2021-2022 World Cup.

Liu retired from cross-country skiing in 2011.

References

External links
 

1982 births
Living people
Chinese female biathletes
Chinese female cross-country skiers
Cross-country skiers at the 2006 Winter Olympics
Olympic cross-country skiers of China
Sport shooters from Dalian
Asian Games medalists in cross-country skiing
Cross-country skiers at the 2007 Asian Winter Games
Cross-country skiers at the 2011 Asian Winter Games
Asian Games medalists in biathlon
Biathletes at the 2003 Asian Winter Games
Biathletes at the 2011 Asian Winter Games
Asian Games silver medalists for China
Asian Games bronze medalists for China
Medalists at the 2007 Asian Winter Games
Medalists at the 2011 Asian Winter Games
Universiade medalists in biathlon
Universiade silver medalists for China
Competitors at the 2009 Winter Universiade
Skiers from Dalian